Adeline 'Billie' Yorke (19 December 1910 – 9 December 2000) was a British tennis player of the 1930s who achieved her best results as a doubles specialist.

At the French Open, she won the women's doubles three years running, along with Simonne Mathieu (1936–1938). With the same partner, she also won Wimbledon in 1937.

In 1935 Yorke won the singles title at the South of England Championships in Eastbourne after a three-sets victory in the final against Susan Noel. In 1938 she won the singles title at the Egyptian Championship in Cairo.

She also won the mixed doubles at the French Championships in 1936, along with Marcel Bernard.

Grand Slam finals

Doubles: 7 (4 titles, 3 runners-up)

Mixed doubles (1 title)

References

External links
Billie Yorke's obituary

British female tennis players
French Championships (tennis) champions
Wimbledon champions (pre-Open Era)
1910 births
2000 deaths
Grand Slam (tennis) champions in women's doubles
Racket sportspeople from Rawalpindi
Grand Slam (tennis) champions in mixed doubles